Karen Beckman may refer to:
 Karen Bridge (1960–2020), English badminton player
 Karen Redrobe, American art historian